Avery is an unincorporated community in Monroe County, Iowa, United States.

Geography

History

Avery was founded in 1868 when the Chicago, Burlington and Quincy Railroad was constructed through the area. It was originally named Coffman, after the owner of the townsite. The name was later changed to Avery, after nearby AveryCreek.

Avery's population was 300 in 1940.

References

Populated places established in 1868
Unincorporated communities in Iowa
Unincorporated communities in Monroe County, Iowa